Capri is an island located in the Tyrrhenian Sea off the Sorrento Peninsula, on the south side of the Gulf of Naples in the Campania region of Italy. The main town of Capri that is located on the island shares the name. It has been a resort since the time of the Roman Republic.

Capri is part of the region of Campania, Metropolitan City of Naples. The separate  of Anacapri is located high on the hills to the west.

Etymology
The etymology of the name Capri is unclear; it might be traced back to the Ancient Greek   meaning 'wild boar', as the Greeks, who were the first recorded colonists to populate the island, called it . It could also derive from Latin  ('goats'). Fossils of wild boars have been discovered, lending credence to the  etymology; on the other hand, the Romans called Capri goat island.

Finally, there is also the possibility that the name derives from an Etruscan word for 'rocky', though any historical Etruscan rule of the island is disputed. Capri consists of limestone and sandstone rock; cliffs form much of the sides and surface of the island.

Government
The voters of the island elect representatives for the two municipalities on the island. The chosen representatives then choose two mayors to govern with them.

History

Ancient and Roman times

The island has been inhabited since early times. Evidence of human settlement was discovered during the Roman era; according to Suetonius, when the foundations for the villa of Augustus were being excavated, giant bones and 'weapons of stone' were discovered. The emperor ordered these to be displayed in the garden of his main residence, the Sea Palace. 

Modern excavations have shown that human presence on the island can be dated to the Neolithic and the Bronze Age. Augustus developed Capri; he built temples, villas, aqueducts, and planted gardens so he could enjoy his private paradise.

In his Aeneid, Virgil states that the island had been populated by the Greek people of Teleboi, coming from the Ionian Islands. Strabo says that "in ancient times in Capri there were two towns, later reduced to one." Tacitus records that there were twelve Imperial villas in Capri. Ruins of one at Tragara could still be seen in the 19th century.

Augustus' successor Tiberius built a series of villas at Capri, the most famous of which is the Villa Jovis, one of the best-preserved Roman villas in Italy. In 27 AD, Tiberius permanently moved to Capri, running the Empire from there until his death in 37 AD.

In 182 AD, Emperor Commodus banished his sister Lucilla to Capri. She was executed shortly afterwards.

Middle and Modern Ages

After the end of the Western Roman Empire, Capri returned to the status of a dominion of Naples, and suffered various attacks and ravages by pirates. In 866 Emperor Louis II gave the island to Amalfi. In 987 Pope John XV consecrated the first bishop of Capri, when Capri, Scala, Minori, and Lettere were made dioceses to serve as suffragans of Amalfi, which thereby became a metropolitan see. Capri continued to be a residential diocese until 1818, when the island became part of the archdiocese of Sorrento. No longer a residential bishopric, Capri, Capreae in Latin, is today listed by the Catholic Church as a titular see.

In 1496, Frederick IV of Naples established legal and administrative parity between the settlements of Capri and Anacapri. The pirate raids reached their peak during the reign of Charles V: the famous Turkish admirals Barbarossa Hayreddin Pasha and Turgut Reis captured the island for the Ottoman Empire, in 1535 and 1553, respectively.

The first recorded tourist to visit the island was French antiques dealer Jean-Jacques Bouchard in the 17th century. His diary, found in 1850, is an important information source about Capri.

1800s–present

French troops under Napoleon occupied Capri in January 1806. The British ousted the French in the following May, after which Capri was turned into a powerful naval base (a "Second Gibraltar"), but the building program caused heavy damage to the archaeological sites. The French reconquered Capri in 1808, and remained there until the end of the Napoleonic era (1815), when Capri was returned to the Bourbon ruling house of Naples.

The natural scientist Ignazio Cerio catalogued Capri's flora and fauna during the 19th century. His work was continued by his son, author and engineer Edwin Cerio, who wrote several books on life in Capri in the 20th century.

Prior to the First World War the island was extremely popular with wealthy gay men. John Ellingham Brooks and Somerset Maugham shared a villa there. Friedrich Alfred Krupp, the German industrialist, was accused of homosexual orgies and eventually committed suicide.

Norman Douglas, Jacques d'Adelswärd-Fersen, Christian Wilhelm Allers, Emil von Behring, Curzio Malaparte, Axel Munthe, Louis Coatalen and Maxim Gorky are all reported to have owned a villa there, or to have stayed there for more than three months. Swedish Queen Victoria often stayed there because Axel Munthe was her doctor. Rose O'Neill, the American illustrator and creator of the Kewpie, owned the Villa Narcissus, formerly owned by the famous Beaux-Arts painter Charles Caryl Coleman. Dame Gracie Fields also had a villa and restaurant on the island and is buried there.  

In 1908, Lenin was hosted by Maxim Gorky, the Russian author, at his house near the Giardini Augusto. In 1970, a monument by Giacomo Manzù was erected during the centennial celebration in Lenin's honour.

Capri, as with the Sicilian resort of Taormina, became "high on the list of places to be visited by homosexual northerners", according to Gregory Woods, Chair in Gay and Lesbian Studies. The history of Taormina was changed by the presence of Wilhelm von Gloeden, known for his homoerotic photography, whose studio from 1878–1931 drew many visitors to the town.  Both Capri and Taormina were tolerant of gay men and artists, and there was much interchange between the two places. In December 1897 Oscar Wilde was planning to winter in Naples with his lover Lord Alfred Douglas; the couple made a short visit to Capri, but their presence proved too scandalous for even that liberal island ("They even denied us bread!"), so "Bosie" headed back to England and Wilde made his way to Taormina, where he spent time with von Gloeden. Jacques d'Adelswärd-Fersen, who settled in Capri and built Villa Lysis, visited von Gloeden in 1923, bringing with him his schoolboy lover/secretary.

Today, Capri has become more of a resort and is visited by tourists during the summer months of July and August. Mariah Carey owns a villa on the island.

Cultural references

During the later half of the 19th century, Capri became a popular resort for European artists, writers and other celebrities.

John Singer Sargent and Frank Hyde are among the prominent artists who stayed on the island around the late 1870s. Sargent is known for his series of portraits featuring local model Rosina Ferrara. The English artist and adventurer, John Wood Shortridge, acquired a fortino at Marina Piccola in the 1880s, (later transformed into a private villa by Dame Gracie Fields) and married a Capri girl, Carmela Esposito. He formed a close friendship with the English novelist George Gissing who provides a colourful and insightful account of his stays with Shortridge in his Published Letters of George Gissing. In the Gissing Journal, vol. XXXV, no. 3 (July, 1999), p. 2. it is recorded that the only mention of him in a recent book, albeit partially inaccurate, occurs in James Money's Capri: Island of Pleasure (London: Hamish Hamilton, 1986, p. 42). Claude Debussy refers to the island's hills in the title of his impressionistic prélude  (1910). Capri is the setting for "The Lotus Eater" (1945), a short story by Somerset Maugham. In the story, the protagonist from Hendon, part of the borough of Barnet in London, comes to Capri on a holiday and is so enchanted by the place he gives up his job and decides to spend the rest of his life in leisure there. British novelist Compton Mackenzie lived there from 1913 to 1920, with later visits, and set some of his work on the island (e.g. Vestal Fire, 1927).

As well as being a haven for writers and artists, Capri served as a relatively safe place for foreign gay men and lesbians to lead a more open life; a small nucleus of them were attracted to live there, overlapping to some extent with the creative types mentioned above. Poet August von Platen-Hallermünde was one of the first. Fersen's life on Capri became the subject of Roger Peyrefitte's fictionalised biography, . A satirical presentation of the island's lesbian colony is made in Mackenzie's 1928 novel Extraordinary Women, inspired by the affairs of American painter Romaine Brooks (in the novel, under the pseudonym of Olimpia Leigh). One of the island's most famous foreign gay exiles was Norman Douglas; his novel South Wind (1917) is a thinly fictionalised description of Capri's residents and visitors, and a number of his other works, both books and pamphlets, deal with the island, including Capri (1930) and his last work, A Footnote on Capri (1952).

Memoirs set on Capri include Edwin Cerio's  (1928) (translated as That Capri Air), which contains a number of historical and biographical essays on the island, including a tribute to Norman Douglas; The Story of San Michele (1929) by Swedish royal physician Axel Munthe (1857–1949), who built a villa of that name, and Shirley Hazzard's Greene on Capri: A Memoir (2000), containing her reminiscences of Graham Greene. Graham Greene had a house in the town of Anacapri, the upper portion of the island, where he lived with his lover Catherine Walston.

Main sights

Annual events
Capri Art Film Festival (every April since 2006)
Festival of San Costanzo (patron saint of Capri) – May 14
Festival of Sant'Antonio (patron saint of Anacapri) – June 13
Capri Tango Festival (every June since 2007)
International Folklore Festival (Anacapri) – August
 e (Anacapri harvest festival) – September
Capri Hollywood International Film Festival (every late December/early January since 1995)
Capri Hollywood 
Eventi Villa San Michele
Premio San Michele 
Premio Faraglioni 
Premio Cari dell Enigma 
Maraton del Golfo Capri

Economy

Capri is a tourist destination for both Italians and foreigners. In the 1950s, Capri became a popular resort. In summer, the island is heavily visited by tourists, especially by day trippers from Naples and Sorrento. Many of these visitors make it a point to wear the Capri pants named after the island. The center of Capri is the Piazza Umberto I.
Capri is home to the Mediterranean bush, the Arboreal Euphorbia, and the Ilex Wood. The native fauna on the island include quails, robins, peregrine falcons, woodcocks, blackbirds, geckos, red goldfish, conger eels, sargos, groupers, mullets, and the blue lizard of the Faraglioni.

Capri has twelve churches, seven museums and several monuments. On one side of the grotto are the remains of ancient Roman rock, with a narrow cavern. As of 2018 there were plans to limit access to day tourists.

The international luxury linen clothing brand 100% Capri opened its first boutique in the main town of Capri in 2000.

Transport

Capri is served by ferry or hydrofoil from Naples, Sorrento, Positano and Amalfi as well as by boat services from the ports of the Bay of Naples and the Sorrentine Peninsula. Boats arrive in the morning and leave after lunch (3–4 pm). Naples is served by two ports: Mergellina and Molo Beverello. Molo Beverello has more frequent departures and a larger selection of boats than Mergellina.

From Naples, the ferry takes 80 minutes, and the hydrofoil 40 minutes. From Sorrento, the ferry takes about 40 minutes while the hydrofoil takes about 20 minutes.

Boats call at Marina Grande, from where the Capri funicular goes up to Capri town. From Anacapri, a chair lift takes passengers to Monte Solaro, the highest point on the island.  There is also a bus service that connects the centre of Capri town with Marina Grande, Marina Piccola, Anacapri and other points.

Airports
The nearest airports are:

 Napoli-Capodichino (NAP)
 Salerno-Pontecagnano (QSR)

Twin towns – sister cities

Capri is twinned with:

  Crosby, Merseyside, United Kingdom

See also
 List of islands of Italy
 Amalfi Coast
 Ischia

References

External links

 Official Capri Tour Guide
 TourItaly.org: Capri
 Capri Insider Tips — by the locals.
 Capri
 Capri 360 panoramas 
 IIalyheaven.co.uk: Capri
 Capri Island APP, a complete guide to Capri on iPad
 Photo Gallery by Leonardo Bellotti 
 Capri Life

 
Islands of Campania
Islands of the Tyrrhenian Sea
Geography of the Metropolitan City of Naples
Ionian colonies in Magna Graecia